Elections to Stevenage Council were held on 6 May 1999.  The whole council was up for election with boundary changes since the last election in 1998. The Labour Party stayed in overall control of the council.

Election result

Ward results

Bandley Hill

Bedwell

Chells

Longmeadow

Manor

Martins Wood

Old Town

Pin Green

Roebuck

St Nicholas

Shephall

Symonds Green

Woodfield

References

1999 Stevenage election result

1999
1999 English local elections
1990s in Hertfordshire